Beat the System is the seventh studio album of the Christian rock band Petra. It was released in late 1984.

It is the first album to feature John Lawry on keyboards, although he only joined towards the end of the recording process; his contributions were limited to some overdubs on the songs "Beat the System", "Clean" and "Adonai". Most of the keyboards on the album, as well as all the bass and drum parts, were performed by session musician Carl Marsh; Petra members Mark Kelly (bass) and Louie Weaver (drums) did not perform on the album. Fairlight programmer Rhett Lawrence added some elements to "Clean" and "Hollow Eyes". Carl Marsh's programming, under the direction of producer Jonathan David Brown, veered the sound of the album more in the synth-rock genre of music. The album was nominated for a Grammy Award for Best Gospel Performance by a Duo or Group in 1986.

Content 
The album includes the band's second cover of "God Gave Rock and Roll to You", the first being on 1977's Come and Join Us. While the album credits Argent's Russ Ballard as sole songwriter this version, like the earlier version, contains lyrics not heard in the original Argent version.

Guitarist Bob Hartman stated that the recordings of some songs were left unfinished for the album and subsequently never released.

Track listing 
All songs written by Bob Hartman, except where noted.
 "Beat the System" – 4:22
 "Computer Brains" – 4:01
 "Clean" – 3:01
 "It Is Finished" – 3:52
 "Voice in the Wind" – 4:30
 "God Gave Rock and Roll to You" (Words & Music by Russ Ballard) – 3:54
 "Witch Hunt" – 4:34
 "Hollow Eyes" – 4:03
 "Speak to the Sky" – 4:16
 "Adonai" – 4:42

Personnel 
Petra
 Bob Hartman – lead guitars, backing vocals 
 Greg X. Volz – lead vocals, vocal arrangements 
 John Lawry – keyboards, additional synthesizer programming, synth solo (1, 3, 10), backing vocals 
 Mark Kelly – bass guitar, synth bass, backing vocals 
 Louie Weaver – drums, percussion 

Additional musicians
 Carl Marsh – Fairlight programming (keyboards, bass, drums and other embellishments), arrangements 
 Rhett Lawrence – additional Fairlight programming
 Jonathan David Brown – arrangements, vocal arrangements 

Production
 Jonathan David Brown – producer, recording at Mama Jo's Recording Studios, North Hollywood, California, additional recording at The Bennett House, Franklin, Tennessee, mixing
 Todd Van Etten – recording assistant
 J.T. Cantwell – recording assistant
 Don Cobb – recording assistant
 Steve Hall – mastering at Future Disc Systems (Hollywood, California).
 Robert Peak Jr. – cover concept, photography
 Lori Cooper – graphic design
 David Hix – electronic photo retouching

Notes

References 

1985 albums
Petra (band) albums